Anikka Albrite is an American retired pornographic actress.

Early life
Albrite was born in Denver, Colorado She is a former lab technician and she double majored in molecular biology and business.

Career
In June 2015, Albrite, Mick Blue and Maestro Claudio formed the production label, BAM Visions, for Evil Angel. That same year, she made her directorial debut with the film Anikka's Bootycise. On June 4, Albrite made her feature dancing debut at the Crazy Horse in San Francisco. Albrite co-hosted the 2016 AVN Awards alongside Joanna Angel on January 23.

Mainstream media appearances 
In 2013, LA Weekly ranked Albrite first on their list of "10 Porn Stars Who Could Be The Next Jenna Jameson". She was also placed on CNBC's list of "The Dirty Dozen: Porn's biggest stars" in 2014, 2015 and 2016. Albrite played a grim reaper in the 2015 mainstream Austrian horror film Chimney or Pit.

Personal life 
Albrite married pornographic actor Mick Blue in 2014.
In 2015, Albrite and Blue won AVN Awards for Female and Male Performer of the Year, making them the first married couple in AVN Awards history to ever win both awards simultaneously.

Awards and nominations

References

External links 

 
 
 
 
 "4 Porn Stars Talk About How They Fell in Love"

Actresses from Denver
American erotic dancers
American female erotic dancers
American people of Czech descent
American people of Danish descent
American people of French descent
American people of German descent
American pornographic film actresses
Living people
Pornographic film actors from Arizona
Pornographic film actors from California
Pornographic film actors from Colorado
Pornographic film actors from Wisconsin
Year of birth missing (living people)
21st-century American women